The Hong Kong Government uses an unpublished system of Romanisation of Cantonese for public purposes which is based on the 1888 standard described by Roy T Cowles in 1914 as Standard Romanisation.  The primary need for Romanisation of Cantonese by the Hong Kong Government is in the assigning of names to new streets and places.  It has not formally or publicly disclosed its method for determining the appropriate Romanisation in any given instance.

Method
Currently, government departments, particularly the Survey and Mapping Office of the Lands Department, consult the Chinese Language Department of the Civil Service Bureau before gazetting names and the latter vet proposed names using the Three Way Chinese Commercial/Telegraphic Code Book, originally published by the Royal Hong Kong Police Force Special Branch for internal government use in 1971.  The code book system is devoid of any tone indications and, being grossly simplified, is susceptible to confusion.

Although the code book has only been available for several decades, the Romanisation approach for place names in Hong Kong has been broadly consistent since before 1888.  This can be seen in maps of the period and in the government's publication A Gazetteer of Place Names in Hong Kong, Kowloon and the New Territories of 1960.

Typical features
For place names, the type of the place in English is often used instead of a romanisation (e.g., "Street" and "Road" in place of "Kai" and "Lo").  Nevertheless, exceptions are not uncommon (for example, "Fong" in "Lan Kwai Fong", meaning "Square" if translated).  "Wan" for "Bay" and "Tsuen" (or "Chuen") for "Estate" (or "Village") are also common.  There are also many instances of surviving pre-1888 Romanisation, such as "Kowloon" and "Un Chau Street", which would be "Kau Lung" and "Yuen Chau" under this system, respectively.

Romanisation of names is mandatory in government identification documents such as identity cards issued by the Registration of Persons Office.  This standard is used by the office by default though individuals are at liberty to choose their own spelling or another romanisation system.

Spelling
All tones are omitted as are distinctions between aspirated and unaspirated stops.  The distinctions between the long vowel  and the short vowel  are omitted like Fat (meaning "to issue") and Fat (meaning "Buddha").

Some of the inconsistencies are due to a distinction that has been lost historically (a distinction between palatal and alveolar sounds, viz. ch versus ts, sh versus s, and j versus z). These consonants are no longer distinguished in present-day speech.

The following table of geographical names illustrates the standard.

Consonants
Initials

Finals

Vowels, diphthongs, and syllabic consonants

The only word that was originally pronounced as m̩ is "唔" (not) and it is not used in place names.

See also
List of common Chinese surnames shows how they are romanised in this scheme.

References

External links 
 粵語拼盤: Learning the Phonetic System of Cantonese
 Linguistic Society of Hong Kong (LSHK)
 Jyutping Pronunciation Guide

Cantonese Romanisation
Cantonese romanisation